Elections to Bury Council took place on 6 May 2010. One third of the Council was up for election and the Conservative Party lost overall control of the Council.

17 seats were contested. The Labour Party won 11 seats, the Conservatives won 4 seats, and the Liberal Democrats won 2 seats

After the election, the total composition of the council was as follows:
Labour 20
Conservative 23
Liberal Democrats 8

Election result

Ward results

References

2010 English local elections
May 2010 events in the United Kingdom
2010
2010s in Greater Manchester